Peronospora conglomerata is a biotrophic plant pathogen (part of the downy mildew taxon) which affects geranium species. Its conidiophores are tree-like and come from the stomata on the leaves. The conidiophores cover the underside of the affected plant's leaves in white patches. These patches may later turn purple or brown. The result of infection by Peronospora conglomerata is scrunched up, yellow leaves that are reduced in size and are prone to falling off.

References

External links

Peronosporales
Species described in 1863
Water mould plant pathogens and diseases
Ornamental plant pathogens and diseases
Taxa named by Karl Wilhelm Gottlieb Leopold Fuckel